Gigantactis is a genus of deep-sea fish of the family Gigantactinidae, first described in 1902 by August Brauer. The most striking feature of these fish is extremely enlarged first filament of dorsal fin, called the illicium, with bioluminescent photophore at its end. (In G. longicauda the length of the illicium can be up to 3.3 times the standard length of the fish.)

Species
, there are currently 20 recognized extant species in this genus:
 Gigantactis balushkini  Kharin, 1984
 Gigantactis elsmani Bertelsen, Pietsch & Lavenberg, 1981 (Elsman's Whipnose)
 Gigantactis gargantua Bertelsen, Pietsch & Lavenberg, 1981 (Gigantic Whipnose)
 Gigantactis gibbsi Bertelsen, Pietsch & Lavenberg, 1981
 Gigantactis golovani Bertelsen, Pietsch & Lavenberg, 1981
 Gigantactis gracilicauda Regan, 1925
 Gigantactis herwigi Bertelsen, Pietsch & Lavenberg, 1981
 Gigantactis ios Bertelsen, Pietsch & Lavenberg, 1981
 Gigantactis kreffti Bertelsen, Pietsch & Lavenberg, 1981
 Gigantactis longicauda Bertelsen & Pietsch, 2002
 Gigantactis longicirra Waterman, 1939
 Gigantactis macronema Regan, 1925
 Gigantactis meadi Bertelsen, Pietsch & Lavenberg, 1981  
 Gigantactis microdontis Bertelsen, Pietsch & Lavenberg, 1981 
 Gigantactis microphthalmus Regan & Trewavas, 1932
 Gigantactis paxtoni Bertelsen, Pietsch & Lavenberg, 1981 (Paxton's whipnose)
 Gigantactis perlatus Beebe & Crane, 1947
 Gigantactis savagei Bertelsen, Pietsch & Lavenberg, 1981
 Gigantactis vanhoeffeni A. B. Brauer, 1902 (Cosmopolitan whipnose)
 Gigantactis watermani Bertelsen, Pietsch & Lavenberg, 1981

References 

Deep sea fish
Bioluminescent fish
Taxa named by August Brauer
Marine fish genera
Gigantactinidae
Taxa described in 1902